The Republic of Korea (commonly known as South Korea) first participated at the Olympic Games in 1948, and has sent athletes to compete in every Summer Olympic Games since then, except for 1980 which they boycotted. South Korea has also participated in every Winter Olympic Games since 1948, except for the 1952 games.

History
The first Korean athletes to win medals did so at the 1936 Summer Olympics in Berlin, when Sohn Kee-chung and Nam Sung-yong won gold and bronze respectively in the men's marathon. However, as Korea was under Japanese rule at that time, and, since both athletes were members of the Japanese team, the IOC credits both medals to Japan.

South Korea won its first medals as an independent nation at its first appearance in 1948, and won its first gold medal in 1976. South Korean athletes have won a total of 287 medals at the Summer Games, with the most gold medals won in archery, and 70 medals at the Winter Games, a majority in short track speed skating.  The nation has won more medals in this winter sport than any other nation since it was introduced to the Olympic program in 1992.

The National Olympic Committee for Korea is the Korean Olympic Committee, and was founded in 1946 and recognized in 1947.

During the 1998-2007 Sunshine Policy era, South Korea and North Korea symbolically marched as one team at the opening ceremonies of the 2000, 2004 and 2006 Olympics, but competed separately.

Hosted Games 
The Republic of Korea has hosted the Games on two occasions:

Unsuccessful bids

Medals

* Purple border colour indicates tournament was held on home soil.

Medals by Summer Games

Medals by Winter Games

Medals by Summer Sport

Medals by Winter Sport

Most successful Olympians

Notes 
On 11 February 2014, Lee Sang-hwa won the gold medal for the women's 500m longtrack speedskating race at the 2014 Sochi Winter Olympics, having previously won the one at the 2010 Games. She became the third woman and first Korean woman to win back-to-back golds at the 500m.

Participated event by competition

Summer Olympics 

 d : demonstration sports
 e : exhibition sports

Winter Olympics 

 d : demonstration sports

Hosted Olympic logo and motto

1988 Summer Olympics

The 1988 Summer Olympics, held in the capital of Seoul, marked the first time the Olympics were held in South Korea.

The logo consists of a rounded tricolor which represents the Olympic rings. The motto of the games was Harmony and Progress (화합과 전진).

2018 Winter Olympics

The 2018 Winter Olympics saw the Olympics return to Korea when it was held in Pyeongchang. 

The logo consists of five intertwined wings which represent the continents (Africa, America, Asia, Europe and Oceania). The motto of the games was Passion. Connected. (하나된 열정; Hanadoen, Yeoljeong).

References

External links

See also
 South Korea at the Paralympics
 List of flag bearers for South Korea at the Olympics
 :Category:Olympic competitors for South Korea
 South Korea at the Asian Games